VietNam is the full-length debut of VietNam, released in January 2007. Mickey Madden and Jesse Carmichael of Maroon 5 helped record this album, with Madden serving as one of the executive producers. Jenny Lewis from Rilo Kiley also makes an appearance on the album.

Track listing 

"Step On Inside" - 3:11
"Priest Poet & The Pig" - 5:00
"Apocalypse" - 4:52
"Mr. Goldfinger" - 4:08
"Toby" - 7:28
"Gabe" - 2:31
"Welcome to My Room" - 5:31
"Hotel Riverview" - 4:43
"Summer in the City" - 5:02
"Too Tired" - 12:04

Trivia
The song Step On Inside appeared in the 2007 movie I Know Who Killed Me, starring Lindsay Lohan.
In the album booklet, Carmichael's name is misspelled as "Jessie".

Personnel
Taken from album booklet:

Lead musicians: Michael Gerner, Joshua Grubb, Ivan Berko, Michael Foss
Additional musicians: Paz Lenchantin, Ana Lenchantin, Paloma Udovic, Dave Scher, Mickey Madden, Jesse Carmichael, Casey Brown, Jason Lader, Cross Roads Girl Choir, Jenny Lewis, Liam Philpot, Slim Zwerling
Produced by: Dave Scher, Jason Lader, Mickey Madden
Engineered by: Jason Lader
Assistance-Engineered by: Paul Figueroa, Kevin Dean, Eric Palaba
Studio Assistance: Josh Smith
Recorded at: Sound City Studios, July–August 2005 and The Sound Factory, August 2005
Mixed by: Jason Lader at Sunset Sound, May 2006
Mastered by: Rick Essig
Photo by: Jennifer Tzar
Cover by: Vincent Perini, David Black
Published by Freedom School Publishing (ASCAP), Billy Josh (ASCAP), Farm Road 149 (ASCAP), Lactaid (ASCAP)
Management by: Casey Brown
Legal Representation by: Richard Grabel for Davis, Shapiro, Lewit, Hayes

All songs are written by: Michael Gerner and Joshua Grubb
All songs are arranged by: Michael Gerner, Joshua Grubb, Ivan Berko, Michael Foss

References

External links
Official band site
Official Myspace site
Record Label's site

2007 debut albums
VietNam (band) albums
Albums recorded at Sound City Studios